Thomas Blackmore was an English politician who served on Liverpool corporation and sat in the House of Commons  in  1659.

Blackmore was an alderman of the borough of Liverpool. In 1659, he was elected Member of Parliament for Liverpool in the Third Protectorate Parliament. After the Restoration, he was discharged in 1662, with other members of Liverpool Corporation, for refusing to subscribe to the declaration for the good governance of corporations.

References

Year of birth missing
Year of death missing
English MPs 1659
Members of the Parliament of England (pre-1707) for Liverpool